Ashley Robertson may refer to:

 Ashley Robertson (cricketer) (born 1972), Australian former cricketer
 Ashley Robertson (singer), country music singer